Avenue George V is a street in the 8th arrondissement of Paris. It starts at Place de l'Alma, and ends at No. 99 avenue des Champs-Elysées. It marks the western limit of Paris's "golden triangle".

Until 14 July 1918, the avenue was called Avenue d'Alma. It received its current name in honour of the British monarch George V, who was on the throne at the time, and fought with the Allies during the First World War.

The notable Four Seasons Hotel George V is located at 31 Avenue George V, whilst the American Cathedral in Paris is located at number 23. The street is served by several bus routes, and by George V metro station, on line 1 of the Paris Metro.

See also
King George Street (Jerusalem)

References

Streets in the 8th arrondissement of Paris
Avenues (landscape) in Paris
Tourist attractions in Paris
Shopping districts and streets in France
Retailing in Paris